Coopersburg Historic District is a national historic district located at Coopersburg, Lehigh County, Pennsylvania.  The district includes 175 contributing buildings in the central business district and surrounding residential areas of Coopersburg.  The buildings are in a variety of architectural styles including Colonial Revival, Queen Anne, and Federal styles. Notable buildings include the Norcross House (1790), Barron House (social hall of the Coopersburg Fire Company), Odd Fellows' Hall, Baldwin House hotel (1856), Gander (or Boye) House, the Cooper Estate, Coopersburg Elementary School (1909), First National Bank of Coopersburg (1920), and Congreve House.  Located in the district is the separately listed Linden Grove Pavilion.

It was added to the National Register of Historic Places in 1982.

References

Historic districts on the National Register of Historic Places in Pennsylvania
Federal architecture in Pennsylvania
Queen Anne architecture in Pennsylvania
Colonial Revival architecture in Pennsylvania
Historic districts in Lehigh County, Pennsylvania
National Register of Historic Places in Lehigh County, Pennsylvania